The San Francisco Police Commission is the governing body of the San Francisco Police Department.

2020 meeting 

The Police Commission heard testimony from SFPD Chief Bill Scott about arrests at protests against police brutality triggered by the murder of George Floyd in Minneapolis.  The Chief's testimony was contradicted by local journalists, protesters, and bystanders.

When public comment was taken on Line Item 1a of the agenda, every single caller asked the commission to abolish the SFPD. There was not a single dissenter.

Public Comment on Line Item 1a lasted for over 3 hours, wherein the moderator was asked to cut off callers who were addressing Line Item 3, Police Department Budget.

References

External links
 Website

San Francisco Police Department